is a railway station on the Rikuu East Line in the city of Shinjō, Yamagata, Japan, operated by East Japan Railway Company (JR East).

Lines
Minami-Shinjō Station is served by the Rikuu East Line, and is located 89.2 rail kilometers from the terminus of the line at Kogota Station.

Station layout
The station has one side platform, serving a single bi-directional track. The station is unattended. The track for the Ōu Main Line (Yamagata Shinkansen) runs through the station without a platform.

History
Minami-Shinjō Station opened on December 20, 1960. The station was absorbed into the JR East network upon the privatization of JNR on April 1, 1987.

Surrounding area

See also
List of railway stations in Japan

External links

 JR East Station information 

Railway stations in Yamagata Prefecture
Rikuu East Line
Railway stations in Japan opened in 1960
Shinjō, Yamagata